"After the Love Has Gone" is a song by Steps, released as their seventh single, and the third from their second album Steptacular. The track continues the group's pop sound but has clear Asian musical influences. Claire Richards provides lead vocals.

Critical reception
AllMusic editor Jon O'Brien described the song as "melancholic dance-pop". Scottish newspaper Aberdeen Evening Express stated that it "has all the trademark Steps piano bits", noting that it "does sound a bit too much" like "Love's Got a Hold on My Heart". Can't Stop the Pop said that the most distinctive element of the track is that it's "proudly dressed up as an oriental number." They also complimented its "beautiful melancholy" lyrics. Sunday Mirror commented, "Net more ABBA sound-aliking from the Steps crew. This dance routine's a bit tricky though."

Chart performance
The song spent 11 weeks on the UK Singles Chart, peaking at number five. It fell out of the top 75 after nine weeks but rose back up to spend two more weeks inside the top 75.

Music video
The music video for the song was shot at Universal Studios Florida in Orlando and has Asian influences. It was directed by Cameron Casey and Simón Brand. The group wear jade-green outfits for the dance sequences, in a setting of Chinese lanterns and a dancing dragon.

Track listings

UK CD single
 "After the Love Has Gone" – 4:35
 "After the Love Has Gone" (W.I.P. Mix) – 5:37
 "My Best Friend's Girl" – 3:40

European maxi-CD single
 "After the Love Has Gone" (radio mix) – 4:35
 "After the Love Has Gone" (video mix) – 4:35
 "After the Love Has Gone" (W.I.P. Mix) – 5:37
 "My Best Friend's Girl" – 3:40

UK cassette single and European CD single
 "After the Love Has Gone" – 4:35
 "My Best Friend's Girl" – 3:40

Australian CD single
 "After the Love Has Gone" (radio mix) – 4:35
 "After the Love Has Gone" (W.I.P. Mix) – 5:37
 "My Best Friend's Girl" – 3:40
 "One for Sorrow" (Tony Moran's 7-inch remix) – 3:30

Credits and personnel
Credits are adapted from the liner notes of Steptacular.

A-side: "After the Love Has Gone"
Recording
 Recorded at PWL Studios, Manchester, in 1999
 Mixed at PWL Studios, Manchester
 Mastered at Transformation Studios, London

Vocals
 Lead vocals – Claire Richards
 Background vocals – Lisa Scott-Lee, Faye Tozer, Lee Latchford-Evans, Ian "H" Watkins

Personnel
 Songwriting – Mark Topham, Karl Twigg, Lance Ellington
 Production – Mark Topham, Karl Twigg, Pete Waterman
 Mixing – Tim Speight
 Engineer – Dan Frampton
 Drums – Chris McDonnell
 Keyboards – Karl Twigg
 Guitar – Mark Topham
 Bass – Mark Topham
 Mandolin – Erwin Keiles

B-side: "My Best Friend's Girl"
Recording
 Recorded at PWL Studios, Manchester, in 1999
 Mixed at PWL Studios, Manchester
 Mastered at Transformation Studios, London

Vocals
 Lead vocals – Ian "H" Watkins
 Background vocals – Claire Richards, Faye Tozer, Lisa Scott-Lee, Lee Latchford-Evans

Personnel
 Songwriting – Mark Topham, Karl Twigg, Lance Ellington
 Production – Mark Topham, Karl Twigg, Pete Waterman
 Mixing – Chris McDonnell

Charts

References

1999 singles
1999 songs
Jive Records singles
Pete Waterman Entertainment singles
Songs written by Karl Twigg
Songs written by Lance Ellington
Songs written by Mark Topham
Steps (group) songs